The sixth and final season of the TV Land original sitcom Hot in Cleveland premiered on November 5, 2014, and consisted of 24 episodes. The series stars Valerie Bertinelli, Wendie Malick, Jane Leeves, and Betty White.

On November 17, 2014, TV Land announced that this season would be the final season of Hot in Cleveland. The series concluded June 3, 2015, after six seasons and 128 episodes. The two-part series finale ("Vegas Baby"; "I Hate Goodbyes") aired as an hour-long episode.

Cast

Main
 Valerie Bertinelli as Melanie Moretti
 Jane Leeves as Rejoyla "Joy" Scroggs
 Wendie Malick as Victoria Chase
 Betty White as Elka Ostrovsky

Recurring
 Georgia Engel as Mamie Sue Johnson
 Dave Foley as Bob
 Craig Ferguson as Simon
 Rhys Darby as Jack
 Michael McMillian as Owen
 William Baldwin as Dane

Special guest stars
 Mario Lopez as himself
 Robert Wagner as Jim
 Ben Vereen as Mayor Deacon
 Ernie Hudson as himself
 Stacy Keach as Alex Chase
 Missi Pyle as Canadian Joy
 Mackenzie Phillips as Kaylin
 Gladys Knight as Miss Shonda
 Garry Marshall as Ari
 George Takei as Reverend Matsuda
 Marla Gibbs as Marcia
 Carol Burnett as Penny Chase
 Chris Colfer as Tony Chase
 Juliet Mills as Philipa Scroggs
 Huey Lewis as Johnny Revere
 Thomas Gibson as Tom
 Bob Newhart as Bob Sr.

Guest stars
 Tom Parker as Peter
 Timm Sharp as Zed
 Andrew J. West as Cooper
 Will Sasso as Frankie
 Bryce Johnson as Dylan
 Millicent Martin as Agnes
 Bayne Gibby as Mona
 Lesley Nicol as Margaret
 Kelly Schumann as Sally
 Samantha Martin as Jenna
 Adam Korson as Barney
 Sophie Winkleman as Jill Scroggs
 Adam Croasdell as Earl of Cleveland
 Sunkrish Bala as Anderson
 Adam Korson as Barney
 Artemis Pebdani as Miss O'Roarke
 Brian Baumgartner as Claude
 Nick Searcy as Chief Barker
 Amber Valletta as Ashley
 Timothy Omundson as Mark
 Andy Milder as Dr. Laird
 Ray Abruzzo as Phil
 Matt Walsh as Arnie
 Kurt Fuller as Gerald
 Kelen Coleman as Andie
 Yvette Nicole Brown as Lily
 Jenny O'Hara as Helen
 Dennis Haskins as Reverend Bower
 Jim O'Heir as Ross
 Marla Sokoloff as Chloe
 Tate Ellington as Kameron
 Todd Grinnell as Nicky
 Tyler Ritter as Bart
 Darlene Hunt as Phyllis

Production
On May 1, 2014, TV Land renewed Hot in Cleveland for a sixth season. Taping for season six began on September 19, 2014, and concluded on April 2, 2015. On November 17, 2014, TV Land announced that season six would be the final season. Guest stars for this season include: Ernie Hudson as one of Victoria's ex-husbands who helps her come to terms with their once embarrassing legacy, Andrew J. West as a young man that hits on Melanie, Timm Sharp as the producer of Victoria's new TV show, and Robert Wagner as Jim, a new man in Elka's life. Mario Lopez also made an appearance as himself. Sophie Winkleman guest stars as Joy's sister, Jill. Returning guest stars for the sixth season include Georgia Engel, Craig Ferguson, Dave Foley, Michael McMillian, Will Sasso, Brian Baumgartner, Chris Colfer and Carol Burnett. Rhys Darby also recurred this season as Jack, a new neighbor and Melanie's brief love interest. Billy Baldwin appears in a story arc as Dane Stevens, a reporter who becomes attracted to Melanie. Stacy Keach plays Victoria's father Alex in two episodes. Missi Pyle also appears in two episodes as "Canadian Joy", Bob's lover from his home country whom he almost marries. Ben Vereen appears as the Mayor of Cleveland. Kelen Coleman portrays Andi, Owen's bride-to-be, while George Takei makes an appearance as the priest for their ceremony. Bob Newhart and Thomas Gibson guest-starred in the series finale, while Huey Lewis reprised his role as Johnny Revere in this same episode.

Release
Season six was released in Region 1 on April 26, 2016. The DVD includes all 24 episodes on 3 discs.

Episodes

References 

General references 
 
 
 

2014 American television seasons
2015 American television seasons
Hot in Cleveland seasons